Physiculus is a genus of morid cods.

Species
The 42 currently recognized species in this genus are:
 Physiculus andriashevi Shcherbachev, 1993
 Physiculus argyropastus Alcock, 1894
 Physiculus beckeri Shcherbachev, 1993
 Physiculus bertelseni Shcherbachev, 1993
 Physiculus capensis Gilchrist, 1922
 Physiculus chigodarana Paulin, 1989
 Physiculus cirm Carvalho-Filho & Pires, 2019
 Physiculus coheni Paulin, 1989
 Physiculus cyanostrophus M. E. Anderson & Tweddle, 2002
 Physiculus cynodon Sazonov, 1986
 Physiculus dalwigki Kaup, 1858 (black codling)
 Physiculus fedorovi Shcherbachev, 1993
 Physiculus fulvus T. H. Bean, 1884 (hakeling)
 Physiculus grinnelli D. S. Jordan & E. K. Jordan, 1922
 Physiculus helenaensis Paulin, 1989 (skulpin)
 Physiculus hexacytus Parin, 1984
 Physiculus huloti Poll, 1953
 Physiculus japonicus Hilgendorf, 1879 (Japanese codling)
 Physiculus karrerae Paulin, 1989
 Physiculus kaupi Poey, 1865
 Physiculus longicavis Parin, 1984
 Physiculus longifilis M. C. W. Weber, 1913 (filament cod)
 Physiculus luminosus Paulin, 1983 (Luminescent cod)
 Physiculus marisrubri Brüss, 1986
 Physiculus maslowskii Trunov, 1991
 Physiculus microbarbata Paulin & Matallanas, 1990
 Physiculus natalensis Gilchrist, 1922
 Physiculus nematopus C. H. Gilbert, 1890 (charcoal mora)
 Physiculus nielseni Shcherbachev, 1993
 Physiculus nigrescens H. M. Smith & Radcliffe, 1912 (darktip cod)
 Physiculus nigripinnis Okamura, 1982
 Physiculus normani Brüss, 1986
 Physiculus parini Paulin, 1991
 Physiculus peregrinus (Günther, 1872)
 Physiculus rastrelliger C. H. Gilbert, 1890 (hundred fathom mora)
 Physiculus rhodopinnis Okamura, 1982
 Physiculus roseus Alcock, 1891 (rosy cod)
 Physiculus sazonovi Paulin, 1991
 Physiculus sterops Paulin, 1989
 Physiculus sudanensis Paulin, 1989
 Physiculus talarae Hildebrand & F. O. Barton, 1949 (Peruvian mora)
 Physiculus therosideros Paulin, 1987 (scalyfin cod)
 Physiculus yoshidae Okamura, 1982

References

 
Moridae
Extant Miocene first appearances
Taxa named by Johann Jakob Kaup
Taxonomy articles created by Polbot